This page lists notable alumni and former students, faculty, and administrators of the College of Wooster.

Alumni

Academia
 Karl Taylor Compton, Philosophy (1908), President of MIT 1930-1948; member of the National Academy of Sciences
Wayne A. Cornelius, Political Science (1967), founder of the Center for Comparative Immigration Studies at the University of California, San Diego
 Frederick Hinitt, Doctor of Divinity (1902), Presbyterian pastor; President of Centre College and Washington & Jefferson College
 Isaac C. Ketler, Presbyterian scholar, founder of Grove City College
 Shannon Boyd-Bailey McCune (1935), geographer and university administrator; President of the University of Florida and the University of Vermont
 Kimberly Bracken Long, B. Mus. (1981), Presbyterian pastor; writer; Associate Professor of Worship at Columbia Theological Seminary
 Merton M. Sealts, Jr., English (1937), Emerson and Melville scholar
 Ronald Takaki, History (1961), historian, ethnographer, professor of ethnic studies at the University of California, Berkeley
 J. Campbell White, President of Wooster, 1915-1919
 Wendell L. Wylie, American Orthodontist
 Courtney Young (librarian), English (1996), Librarian and past president of the American Library Association, 2014-2015
 Nancy Zahniser, pharmacologist

Business
 George Fitch, Economics (1970), politician and business consultant; co-founder of the Jamaican Bobsled Team, which debuted at the 1988 Winter Olympics in Calgary, Alberta
 Stanley Gault, Geology (1948), former CEO of Rubbermaid and Goodyear Tire and Rubber Company
 Charles F. Kettering, inventor of electric automobile starter motor; Vice President of General Motors Research Corporation; namesake of Memorial Sloan-Kettering Cancer Center; attended but did not graduate
 Blake Moore, History (1980), NFL lineman for the Cincinnati Bengals and Green Bay Packers; CEO of Allianz Global Investors
 R.J. Thomas,  President of the United Auto Workers
 Bill Townsend, Art (1986), Internet entrepreneur, politician, founder and chairman of the Amati Foundation

Education
 Margaret Lee Chadwick, founder and headmistress of the Chadwick School, and author

Government
 W. Thomas Andrews (1963), Pennsylvania State Senator
 William Moore McCulloch, chair of the United States House Committee on the Judiciary, forced Civil Rights Act of 1964 through Congress
 John Carwile, U.S. Ambassador to Latvia (2019-present)
 Ted Celeste, member of the Ohio House of Representatives
 John Dean, Political Science (1961), White House Counsel (1970–1973) to President Richard Nixon
 Eugene A. DePasquale, Political Science (1993), Pennsylvania Auditor General
 David Dudley Dowd Jr. (1951), United States federal judge, United States District Court for the Northern District of Ohio
 Charlie Earl, former Ohio state representative; candidate in the 2014 Ohio gubernatorial election
Mark F. Giuliano, Deputy Director of the Federal Bureau of Investigation
 Donald Kohn, Economics (1964), Vice Chairman of the Board of Governors of the United States Federal Reserve
 Ping-Wen Kuo (1911), Chinese educator and statesman
 John McSweeney (1912), member of the United States House of Representatives
 John T. Morrison (1887), sixth Governor of Idaho, 1903-1905
 Norman Morrison, Religion (1956), pacifist, Vietnam War protester
 Solomon Oliver Jr., Philosophy and Political Science (1969), U.S. District Court Chief Judge for the Northern District of Ohio
 Carl V. Weygandt (1912), Chief Justice of the Supreme Court of Ohio

Journalism
 Vince Cellini, Speech (1981), host of The Golf Channel; former anchor for CNN Sports
 Alfred William Edel, History (1957), news anchor for ABC Radio News and Voice of America
 Daniel Howes, History (1983), business columnist for The Detroit News
Mary Sifton Pepper (1883), journalist and translator on The Jesuit Relations
 Mark Stephens, also known as Robert X. Cringely, History (1975), technology journalist for Public Broadcasting Service

Literature
 Debra Allbery, English (1979), poet (Walking Distance), winner of the 1990 Agnes Lynch Starrett Poetry Prize
 Frederic Lauriston Bullard (1891), Pulitzer Prize-winning journalist for the Boston Herald; Lincoln historian; writer (Famous War Correspondents)
 Mary Crow, English (1955), Poet Laureate of Colorado
 Stephen R. Donaldson, English (1968), New York Times bestselling science fiction author (Thomas Covenant)
 John Lawrence Goheen (1906), missionary, agriculturist, writer (Glimpses of Ichalkaranji)
 David Means, English (1984), short story writer (Assorted Fire Events), winner of 2000 Los Angeles Times Book Prize for Fiction

Performing arts
 James B. Allardice, Emmy Award winning television writer
 Caitlin Cary, English (1990), alt-country musician, member of the band Whiskeytown
 J.C. Chandor, Cultural Film Studies (1996), film director, Margin Call
 Darius Scott Dixson (DIXSON), Academy Award-nominated Songwriter & Music Producer, "Be Alive", contestant on The Voice (American season 9)
 Divya Gopikumar, Psychology (2008), South Indian actress
 Duncan Jones (aka Zowie Bowie or Joey Bowie), Philosophy (1995), British film director of Moon and Source Code; son of rock musician David Bowie
 Debi Smith, Psychology (1976), folk singer/songwriter and member of the Four Bitchin' Babes

Religion
 Sophia Lyon Fahs (1897), honorary degree (1961), writer, liberal religious activist, and educator
Elizabeth Eaton, Music Education (1977), Presiding Bishop of the Evangelical Lutheran Church in America (ELCA) from 2013–present.

Science
 Arthur Holly Compton, Physics (1913), Nobel Prize-winning physicist; member of the National Academy of Sciences; Chancellor of Washington University 1945-1953
 Helen Murray Free, Chemistry (1945), elected President of the American Chemical Society in 1993; inducted into the National Inventors Hall of Fame in 2000
 Martha Chase (1950), American geneticist; performed the Hershey–Chase experiment in 1952, proving that genetic information is transmitted by DNA and not protein.
 Elizebeth Friedman, America's first female cryptologist; attended briefly but transferred elsewhere
 George E. Goodfellow (1876), physician, authority on gunshot wounds, first surgeon to perform a perineal prostatectomy
 Tim McCreight, Art (1973), artist and metalsmith; President of the Society of North American Goldsmiths (1993–1994)
 James V. Neel, Biology (1935), Distinguished Professor of Human Genetics University of Michigan; Albert Lasker Award winner, National Medal of Science winner, National Academy of Sciences member; "father of modern human genetics"
 James C. Stevens, Chemistry (1975), Distinguished Fellow at Dow Chemical; inventor of constrained geometry catalyst for polyolefin manufacture; member of the National Academy of Engineering
 George W. Thorn, Biology (1927), Chief of Medicine, Bringham & Woman's Hospital Harvard University; NAS Public Welfare Medal winner; Chairman Emeritus Howard Hughes Medical Institute
 John Travis, Chemistry (1965), preventive medicine physician, founder of first wellness center in US

Sports
 Charles Follis (1902*), the first black professional football player; he played for a team in the Ohio League (which later became the NFL)
 Reggie Minton, Physical Education (1963), deputy executive director of the National Association of Basketball Coaches; head basketball coach United States Air Force Academy (1985–2000)
 Larry Shyatt, Physical Education (1973), basketball coach; head coach of Clemson University and the University of Wyoming; assistant coach of the Dallas Mavericks (2016-2019)

Faculty
 Daniel Bourne, poet, professor of English
 Joanne Frye, writer, professor of English and Women's Studies
 Jack Gallagher, composer, Olive Williams Kettering Professor of Music
 William Gass, novelist (The Tunnel), professor of philosophy and English
 R. Stanton Hales, president of Wooster (1995–2007), national US badminton champion 
 Dario Hunter, rabbi
 Jack Lengyel, head football coach and lacrosse coach 1966–1970; head football coach at Marshall University 1971–1974
 Hayden Schilling, professor of history
 Orange Nash Stoddard, professor of natural history
 Anthony Tognazzini, writer, professor of Creative Writing
 Josephine Wright, musicologist, Josephine Lincoln Morris Professor of Black Studies

References

Lists of people by university or college in Ohio
College of Wooster